The 1912–13 Toronto Tecumsehs season was the first season of the Toronto Tecumsehs professional ice hockey team in the National Hockey Association (NHA).

Team business
Before the season started, the franchise was transferred to the Tecumseh amateur ice hockey organization after a previous sale from Ambrose O'Brien of the NHA failed. The team was placed under the management of goaltender Billy Nicholson, who operated as manager, coach and player.

Regular season
The team's first goal was scored by Harry Smith in the first period of their first game against the Montreal Wanderers.

The team placed in sixth place in the league and failed to qualify for the playoffs.

Standings

Schedule and results

Results

‡ Played with rover (7 man hockey)

Source: Coleman (1966)

References

Toronto Tecumsehs seasons
Tor